Alexander Rüstow (13 October 1824 – 25 July 1866) was a Prussian soldier and military writer from Brandenburg an der Havel. The brother of Wilhelm Rüstow and Cäsar Rüstow, he is remembered for his work Der Küstenkrieg (Berlin, 1848).  Alexander and Cäsar both fell on the field of battle during the 1866 Austro-Prussian War, with Alexander dying at Horitz from wounds sustained in the Battle of Königgrätz.

Literature
 Meyers Lexikon. 1896, Bibliographisches Institut, Leipzig Wien 1896.
 Allgemeine Deutsche Biographie, 30.Bd. Neudruck der Auflage von 1890, Verlag Duncker und Humblot, 1970 Berlin, S. 37
 Theodor Fontane: Der Feldzug in Böhmen und Mähren 1866. Verlag der Königlichen Geheimen Ober-Hofbuchdruckerei (R. v. Decker), Berlin, 1871

External links
  About his life 

1824 births
1866 deaths
19th-century German writers
19th-century German male writers
19th-century Prussian military personnel
German male non-fiction writers
German military personnel killed in action
German military writers
People from Brandenburg an der Havel
People from the Province of Brandenburg
Prussian Army personnel
Prussian people of the Austro-Prussian War
Military personnel from Brandenburg